Tapuah Junction stabbing may refer to:
2010 Tapuah Junction stabbing
 2013 Tapuah Junction stabbing